The 2020–21 Verbandspokal (English: 2020–21 Association Cup) consisted of twenty-one regional cup competitions, the Verbandspokale, the qualifying competition for the 2021–22 DFB-Pokal, the German Cup.

All clubs from the 3. Liga and below could enter the regional Verbandspokale, subject to the rules and regulations of each region. Clubs from the Bundesliga and 2. Bundesliga could not enter but were instead directly qualified for the first round of the DFB-Pokal. Reserve teams were not permitted to take part in the DFB-Pokal or the Verbandspokale. The precise rules of each regional Verbandspokal are laid down by the regional football association organising it.

All twenty-one winners qualified for the first round of the German Cup in the following season. Three additional clubs also qualified for the first round of the German Cup, these being from the three largest state associations, Bavaria, Westphalia and Lower Saxony. The Lower Saxony Cup was split into two paths, one for teams from the 3. Liga and the Regionalliga Nord and one for the teams from lower leagues. The winners of both paths qualified for the DFB-Pokal. In Bavaria the winners of the  qualified for the DFB-Pokal while in Westphalia the best-placed Westphalian Regionalliga West team qualified.

The finals of the Verbandspokal competitions were scheduled to be played on the Amateurs' Final Day, which was scheduled for 29 May 2021.

By the end of April 2021, a large number of state and regional associations had already cancelled or even annulled their league seasons from the Regionalliga downwards due to the COVID-19 pandemic in Germany. As a result, in several association cup competitions, the final rounds had not even been reached or only the first rounds had been played. Further handling was therefore up to each individual association, which should ultimately determine two finalists or a participant in the DFB-Pokal.

Competitions
The finals of the 2020–21 Verbandspokal competitions (winners listed in bold):

Notes

References

External links
Official DFB website The German Football Association
Fussball.de : Official results website of the DFB

2020–21 in German football cups
Verbandspokal seasons